Nandayuan Township  is a township-level division of Nanshi District, Baoding, Hebei, China.

See also
List of township-level divisions of Hebei

References

Township-level divisions of Hebei
Lianchi District